Austria's Next Top model is an Austrian reality television series based on Tyra Banks's America's Next Top Model. The show features a series of aspiring models that compete against each other in different competitions, determining who will win Austria's Next Top model, among other prizes.

History
The show was hosted by Lena Gercke, the winner of the first cycle of Germany's Next Top model. Gercke is the first Top Model winner to become the host of a Top Model series. The judging panel for the show's first cycle consisted of the head of Vienna-based modeling agency Wiener Models, Andrea Weidler, and runway coach Alamanda Belfor. It aired from January to February 2009 and was won by Larissa Marolt. As part of her prize package for winning the contest, Marolt won a place on the fourth cycle of Germany's Next Top model, where she placed eighth.

In mid-2009, Puls 4 aired a spin-off of the show Die Model WG, which featured six of cycle one's contestants. The show was won by Kordula Stöckl .

The second cycle aired from November 2009 to February 2010. Its catchphrase was "More girls, more jet set, more glamour." Former model and photographer Andreas Ortner joined the judging panel, replacing Alamanda Belfor. Beauty expert Sabine Landl, the models' stylist in cycle 1, also joined the panel. The winner of the cycle was Aylin Kösetürk.

The third cycle premiered in January 2011 and introduced new judges: the designer Atil Kutoglu and the runway coach Elvyra Geyer. Gercke remained the host. The cycle featured a significant change in the cast, and one girl per federal state and five wildcards made the cut. Additionally, in every episode, competitors that won the casting travelled to an international destination.

Gercke did not return to host the fifth cycle opting to instead concentrate on her own modeling career. In January 2013 the Austrian model, Melanie Scheri au, took over as host. The sixth cycle featured male contestants for the first time and aired in late 2014. Cycle 7 aired from late 2015 to spring 2016 while cycle 8 began to air in November 2017.

Males were introduced to the competition in the sixth cycle of the show. The social media scoring system used in the American version of the show was also implemented in the sixth cycle. In contrast to the American version of the show, each voter was required to cast their votes via Facebook. Furthermore, there was no grading scale. Each Facebook account was allotted three votes, which could be spent on any combination of contestants. The competitor with the highest number of votes in each round was granted immunity. At the same time, the contestant with the lowest amount was automatically nominated for elimination, along with three other contestants chosen by the judges.

The ProSiebenSat.1 Mediagroup announced in April 2017 that the eighth cycle would air on ATV Austria, thus temporarily moving the show from Puls 4.

Cycle 9 was again broadcast by Puls 4.

Judges

Controversies

Show title
Before the show began, it caused controversy due to another modeling contest named  (German for "Austria's") Next Top model, established in 2007. Dominik Wachta, the founder of what can be described as a mix between model casting and a beauty pageant, accused the TV channel Puls 4 of stealing his idea. Further steps to change the name of the show were unsuccessful as it was already licensed by CBS as the role-model version created by Tyra Banks.

Racism controversy
In the third cycle, contestant Magalie Berkhahn was eliminated from the show due to the racist comments she made during a phone conversation with her boyfriend. She referred to fellow competitor Lydia Nnenna Obute as "Neger Oide" (negative afflicted Austrian slang for "black woman") and to Vanessa Lotz as "Dietsche" (slang for German woman). Both Obute and Lotz won a "go-see" in that episode. The conversation was fully taped and aired during the show. Berkhahn was confronted by host Lena Gercke with the video material in front of the other two girls. Gercke then told Berkhahn that she was expelled from the show because the competition had no room for racist ideas or thoughts. Puls 4 was later accused of using the controversy for promotional purposes, as Berkhahn's comments had already been shown in the preview for the episode and were not censored when the episode aired. Berkhahn was not invited to the final runway show during the cycle's finale. Berkhahn later stated that the scandal had ruined her life.

Death of Sabrina Rauch
In January 2012, 21-year-old Sabrina Angelika Rauch (a cycle 4 contestant) died in a car crash after spinning out of control on her way home from a party. Her vehicle collided with a concrete mast, when Rauch was killed instantly at the scene of the accident. Her co-driver, a 26-year-old male friend, survived the accident. Only three days before the episode featuring Rauch's elimination was aired, a nude photo from a shoot she did before her participation on the show was exposed. She was confronted by the judges for having taken the photos, and the judges stated that it was 'too low for a top model' while the other contestants witnessed the scene. In addition, a friend of Rauch criticized the program for editing that specific scene. At the beginning of the next episode of the show, the broadcast station expressed their condolences to Rauch's relatives and friends on a silent screen.

Cycles

References

 
2000s Austrian television series
2010s Austrian television series
2009 Austrian television series debuts
Non-American television series based on American television series
Puls 4 original programming